Uvariodendron connivens is a species of plant in the family Annonaceae. It is found in Cameroon and Nigeria. It is threatened by habitat loss.

References

connivens
Flora of Cameroon
Flora of Nigeria
Near threatened flora of Africa
Taxonomy articles created by Polbot